Jeannot Bemba Saolona (born September 1941 at Libanga, Équateur, Belgian Congo, died 1 July 2009 Brussels, Belgium) was a Congolese businessman, Minister of the Economy and Industry, and Senator for Équateur. His son Jean-Pierre Bemba became the last Vice-President of the Democratic Republic of the Congo.

Bemba Saolona's company, Scibe CMMJ, was implicated by the United Nations in smuggling weapons to UNITA during the Angolan Civil War. He was a close confidant to President Mobutu Sese Seko.

References

1941 births
2009 deaths
People from Sud-Ubangi
Government ministers of the Democratic Republic of the Congo
Democratic Republic of the Congo businesspeople
20th-century businesspeople
21st-century Democratic Republic of the Congo people